Jilly is a feminine given name. Notable people with the name include:

Jilly Cooper (born 1937), English author
Jilly Goolden (born 1956), British wine critic, journalist and television personality
Jilly Johnson (born 1953), British model, Page 3 girl
Jilly Rizzo (1917 – 1992), American restaurateur and entertainer
Jilly's, a popular New York City night club owned by Jilly Rizzo

Fictional characters:
Jilly Kitzinger character in the science fiction series Torchwood
Jilly Coppercorn, character in 2001 book The Onion Girl

See also
Jilly's, a strip club on the lower floor of the New Broadview House Hotel in Toronto, Canada
The Jillies series, a series of works by author Malcolm Saville
Skye-Jilly Edwards (born c. 1972) Australian beauty pageant titleholder
Jill (disambiguation)
Jillian
Gillian

Feminine given names